O Jerusalem is a 2006 drama film directed by Elie Chouraqui. It is based on the historical documentary novel of the same name, written by Dominique Lapierre and Larry Collins.

The working title for release in the US is Beyond Friendship. It was produced for US distribution by Jeffrey Konvitz.

Plot
Two Americans, one Jewish, the other Arab, are friends. As the United Nations votes for the creation of the state of Israel, both are pulled into conflict, their involvement taking them from New York City to Jerusalem, where they risk their lives for what they each believe in. It depicts the 1947–1949 Palestine war and the end of the British mandate of Palestine.

Cast
 JJ Feild – Bobby Goldman
 Saïd Taghmaoui – Saïd Chahine
 Maria Papas – Hadassah
 Patrick Bruel – David Levin
 Ian Holm – David Ben Gurion
 Tovah Feldshuh – Golda Meir
 Mel Raido – Jacob
 Cécile Cassel – Jane
 Mhairi Steenbock – Cathy
 Tom Conti – Sir Cunningham
 Shirel – Yaël
 Peter Polycarpou – Abdel Khader
 Yonatan Uziel as Post manager

Critical reception
The film received bad reviews from critics. Review aggregator Rotten Tomatoes reports that 33% of professional critics gave the film a positive review, with an average rating of 4.6 out of 10, and the site consensus being "Though a noble effort, O Jerusalem fails to combine this history lesson and human drama into a coherent cinematic piece."

References

External links
 

2006 films
French drama films
2006 drama films
Films directed by Élie Chouraqui
Cultural depictions of Golda Meir
Cultural depictions of David Ben-Gurion
Films set in Israel
Films set in the 1940s
Films about the Arab–Israeli conflict
2000s French films